A claim is a statement that one subject, such as a person or organization, makes about a subject. A claim is a debatable statement that an author manifests in a text or theoretical construction, so that the reader accepts it, something that not everyone will accept. 

An objective claim is a statement about a factual matter-one that can be proved true or false.  A subjective claim is not a factual matter; it is an expression of belief, opinion, or personal preference, and cannot be proved right or wrong by any generally accepted criteria.

See also
Truth claim

References
Abbagnano (1979) - Diccionario de Filosofía. 	
http://www.butte.edu/departments/cas/tipsheets/thinking/claims.html

Arguments
Term logic
Sentences by type